Version 2014.2 of the IUCN Red List of Threatened Species identified 78 (40 animal, 39 plant) extinct in the wild species, subspecies and varieties, stocks and subpopulations.

For IUCN lists of extinct in the wild species by kingdom, see:

Animals (kingdom Animalia) — IUCN Red List extinct in the wild species (Animalia)
Plants (kingdom Plantae) — IUCN Red List extinct in the wild species (Plantae)

References
 List of Extinct in the Wild Species. IUCN Red List of Threatened Species. Version 2014.2. International Union for Conservation of Nature. 2014. Retrieved 30 August 2014.